HR 8799 e is a large exoplanet, orbiting the star HR 8799, which lies 129 light-years from Earth. This gas giant is between 5 and 10 times the mass of Jupiter, the largest planet in the Planetary System. Due to their young age and high temperature all four discovered planets in the HR 8799 system are large, compared to all gas giants in the Solar System.

Description
HR 8799 e is the fourth planet orbiting HR 8799 in order of discovery. It is a young, hot and massive gas giant, and is fairly close to its star, lying just between the orbits of Saturn and Uranus in the Solar System. The planet is still glowing red-hot.

HR 8799 e is the innermost known planet as it orbits closer to its star than the other three known planets in this planetary system. This planet orbits at an estimated distance of 14.5 AU based on the relationship between angular separation measured by direct imaging observations and the star's distance from Earth. The estimated period of this planet if the orbit is face-on is about 50 years.

Discovery
A team of researchers led by Christian Marois at the National Research Council's Herzberg Institute of Astrophysics identified the planet from data taken in 2009 and 2010 using the W.M. Keck Observatory in the K and L spectral bands.  They announced their findings on 22 November 2010.  A separate work reporting the detection of HR 8799 e, led by Thayne Currie and using the Very Large Telescope, was made public six weeks later.  Observations obtained since then with the Large Binocular Telescope show that HR 8799 e has a spectrum and temperature similar to HR 8799 c and d.

Observations
In 2013, near infrared spectroscopy from 995 to 1769 nanometers made with the Palomar Observatory showed evidence of methane and acetylene but no signs of ammonia or carbon dioxide gas. There is no explanation as to why the planet shows strong methane absorption, but the other 3 planets in this system do not, despite all 4 planets having similar atmospheric temperatures.

On 27 March 2019, the European Southern Observatory announced the result of their Very Large Telescope astronomical interferometer (VLTI) imaging of HR 8799 e employing the GRAVITY instrument. This was the first direct observation of any exoplanet using optical interferometry. A spectrum ten times more detailed than earlier observations revealed a complex exoplanetary atmosphere with clouds of iron and silicates swirling in a planet-wide storm. Team leader Sylvestre Lacour said: "Our analysis showed that HR8799e has an atmosphere containing far more carbon monoxide than methane — something not expected from equilibrium chemistry. We can best explain this surprising result with high vertical winds within the atmosphere preventing the carbon monoxide from reacting with hydrogen to form methane."The observations with GRAVITY confirmed the spectral type of ~L7 for the planet HR 8799 e. Previously the spectral type suggested a higher temperature than the measured effective temperature. The GRAVITY observations showed that the planet has a low surface gravity, which solved the discrepancy. A low surface gravity is also observed for many young brown dwarfs and is seen as an indicator of youth.

The detection of water and carbon monoxide in planetary atmosphere was announced in 2021.

References

External links

HR 8799
Exoplanets discovered in 2010
Pegasus (constellation)
Giant planets
Exoplanets detected by direct imaging
Exoplanets detected by astrometry